Yiwei Hou is an electrical engineer at the Virginia Polytechnic Institute & State University in Blacksburg, Virginia. He was named a Fellow of the Institute of Electrical and Electronics Engineers (IEEE) in 2014 for his contributions to modeling and optimization of wireless networks.

References

Fellow Members of the IEEE
Living people
21st-century American engineers
Year of birth missing (living people)
Place of birth missing (living people)
Virginia Tech faculty
American electrical engineers